Sheila Elias (born in Chicago) is an American artist. Her works have been featured in exhibitions across North America and at the Liberty show at the Louvre Museum in Paris.

Biography
Elias graduated from the Art Institute of Chicago, lives and works in Miami, Florida and in New York City.
As an artist and art historian, Elias works with the layers of life and art history, seeking in it a connection between art aesthetics and social consciousness.

Elias has been doing installations reflecting her studio's neighborhood since the 1980s and she has received recognition for her blend of social consciousness and aesthetics. Her work spans the disciplines of painting, digital mixed media, sculpture, installation and performance.

Notable exhibitions

2009
Museo Vault in Wynwood Art District, Miami
Coral Springs Museum of Art, Sheila Elias: Somewhere-Anywhere, Coral Springs, Florida

2008
Lila G. Martinez Gallery, Cambridge, Massachusetts
The Multicultural Arts Center, Cambridge, Massachusetts
The Napoleon Grand Salon at The Deauville Hotel, Miami Beach, Florida
Riverside Art Museum, Riverside, California

2007
Farmani Gallery, "SOMEWHERE-ANYWHERE", Los Angeles
Boca Grande Art Alliance National Exhibition.
Maryland Federation of Art.
Visual Arts Center of New Jersey.

2006
Bass Museum, "I Wanna Be Loved by You: Photographs of Marilyn Monroe", Miami Beach, Florida
Masur Museum of Art.

2005
Lancaster County Art

2004
OMNIART, "Sonic Silence", Miami, Florida

2003
Boca Raton Museum of Art
Norton Museum of Art

2002
Bass Museum, Miami Beach, Florida
Jewish Museum of Florida

2001
Kim Foster Gallery, "Beyond the Camera...", New York
Silvana Facchini Gallery, "Living in Miami", Miami, Florida
South Florida / Art Center, "Reconnect", Miami Beach, Florida
Maryland Federation of Art, "Art on Paper 2001"
Corcoran Gallery, Annapolis, Maryland, juror David C. Levy

1999
Veneto Gallery, Miami, Florida
Marguiles Taplin Gallery, Bay Harbour, Florida

1998–1997
"Secret Gardens", Travelling Exhibition, Lowe Art Museum, Miami, Florida
Public Art Program, City of Orlando, Florida
Lowe Museum, University of Miami, Florida
Art and Culture Center of Hollywood, Hollywood, Florida

1996
Bernard Biderman Gallery, New York

1994
Metro Dade Cultural Resource Center, Miami, Florida
Huntsville Museum of Art

1996
New England Center for Contemporary Art
San Diego Art Institute, California

1992–87
Anne Jaffe Gallery, Bay Harbour, Florida

1990
Ratner Gallery, Chicago
Santa Monica Heritage Museum, Los Angeles

1989–87
Paula Allan Gallery, New York.
1988 Otis Parsons School of Design, "Hollywood: Portrait of the Stars" California

1987
Louvre, Institute des Decoratifs, "Liberty: the Official Exhibitions Centenary of the Statue of Liberty", Louvre Institut des Decoratifs, Paris, France
New York Public Library, New York
Gallery Q, Tokyo, Japan
University of North Carolina, Chapel Hill, North Carolina
New York University, Loeb Gallery, New York
Riverside Art Museum, Riverside, California

1986
Danville Museum of Fine Arts, Danville, Virginia

1986–84
Alex Rosenberg Gallery, New York
New York University, New York

1986–82
Stella Polaris Gallery, Los Angeles
University of North Carolina, Chapel Hill, North Carolina

1985
Pictogram Gallery, East Village, New York
California State University, Northridge, California
Institute for Contemporary Arts, Korea
Forcus International, "American Woman in Art", Nairobi, Kenya
Laguna Beach Museum of Art, OCCA, Long Beach, California
Gallery One, Fort Worth, Texas, juror: Dr. William Otton
Janco-Dada Museum, Ein Hod, Israel

1984
Rutgers University, New Jersey
Arizona State University, Ariz.
American Academy of Fine Arts and Letters, New York

Works in public collections

Frost Art Museum, Miami, Florida
American Bankers Inc., Miami, Florida
Capital Bank, Los Angeles; Miami, Florida
Brooklyn Museum, Brooklyn, New York.
Chase Manhattan Bank Collection, New York.
First Los Angeles Bank Collection, Los Angeles
Kunsan Contemporary Museum, Korea.
Miami Dade Community College, Miami, Florida
Paramount Pictures, Los Angeles
Security Pacific Bank Collection, Los Angeles
Vesti Corporation, Boston
University of Michigan, Dearborn, Michigan
Bass Museum of Art, Miami Beach, Florida
Lowe Art Museum, University of Miami, Miami, Florida
American Bankers Life Assurance Company of Florida.
Artforum Culture Foundation, Thessaloniki.

References

External links 
 Official website
 Art Slant – bio, works

Artist's books

Living people
American women artists
Artists from Illinois
Artists from Miami
1945 births
21st-century American women